Junyo (sometimes written Dyunyo) may refer to either of the Japanese ships:

 
 , a Japanese cargo ship that was sunk in 1944

Ship names